Kaiavere is a village in Tartu Parish, Tartu County, Estonia. It has a population of 54 (as of 1 January 2009).

References

Villages in Tartu County